SS John B. Gordon was a Liberty ship built in the United States during World War II. She was named after John B. Gordon, a Confederate States Army general, United States Senator from Georgia, and 53rd Governor of Georgia.

Construction
John B. Gordon was laid down on 6 September 1943, under a Maritime Commission (MARCOM) contract, MC hull 1504, by J.A. Jones Construction, Brunswick, Georgia; sponsored by Mrs. Charles I. Allan, sister-in-law of J.A. Jones acting president, Edwin Jones, and launched on 16 November 1943.

History
She was allocated to T.J. Stevenson & Co., Inc., on 26 November 1943. On 18 May 1946, she was laid up in the National Defense Reserve Fleet in the James River Group, Lee Hall, Virginia. On 15 September 1959, she was sold to Bethlehem Steel, for $71,781, for scrapping. She was delivered on 23 September 1959.

References

Bibliography

 
 
 
 
 

 

Liberty ships
Ships built in Brunswick, Georgia
1943 ships
James River Reserve Fleet